Lajia (Mandarin: 拉加镇) is a town in Maqên County, Golog Tibetan Autonomous Prefecture, Qinghai, China. In 2010, Lajia had a total population of 12,045 people: 6,405 males and 5,640 females: 3,502 under 14 years old, 7,920 aged between 15 and 64 and 623 over 65 years old.

References 

Golog Tibetan Autonomous Prefecture
Township-level divisions of Qinghai